Albert Heux (15 February 1892 – 26 August 1980) was a French racing cyclist. He rode in the 1919 Tour de France.

References

1892 births
1980 deaths
French male cyclists
Place of birth missing